The 1988 Taça de Portugal Final was the final match of the 1987–88 Taça de Portugal, the 48th season of the Taça de Portugal, the premier Portuguese football cup competition organized by the Portuguese Football Federation (FPF). The match was played on 19 June 1988 at the Estádio Nacional in Oeiras, and opposed two Primeira Liga sides: Porto and Vitória de Guimarães. Porto defeated Vitória de Guimarães 1–0 to claim the Taça de Portugal for a sixth time.

In Portugal, the final was televised live on RTP. As Porto claimed both league and cup double in the same season, cup runners-up Vitória de Guimarães faced their cup final opponents in the 1988 Supertaça Cândido de Oliveira.

Match

Details

References

1988
Taca
FC Porto matches
Vitória S.C. matches